Steep Hill Brook is a tributary of Six Mile Run in central and north central Franklin Park, Somerset County, New Jersey in the United States.

Course
It starts in Scott Farm, a local farm bordering Van Cleef Road and Amwell Road. It flows south into the Six Mile Run Reservoir Site, a preserved area around Six Mile Run.

Accessibility
Steep Hill Brook is a rather short stream. It only crosses one road, Blackwells Mills Road, where it is easily accessible on one side. It can be accessed by some trails in the woods too.

Animal life
Steep Hill Brook has many fish, as they prefer the oxygenated environment. There are several frogs in the slow moving places, although the fine gravel is less hospitable to them than mud.

Terrain
The streambed of Steep Hill Brook is composed of fine reddish gravel in most places. Some shale cliffs may be found along its banks. This stream is generally medium-fast flowing and shallow. "Sandbars" formed by accumulation of gravel are common. Short stalactites may be found growing at the bridge at Blackwells Mills Road.

Sister tributaries
Cross Brook
Nine Mile Run
Middlebush Brook

Gallery

See also
List of rivers of New Jersey

References

External links
USGS Coordinates in Google Maps

Tributaries of the Raritan River
Rivers of New Jersey
Rivers of Somerset County, New Jersey